Paroxya clavuligera, the olive-green swamp grasshopper, is a species of spur-throated grasshopper in the family Acrididae. It is found in the south and eastern United States.

References

External links

 

Melanoplinae
Insects described in 1838